Enobius is an extinct genus of dinocephalian therapsids. It is known from jaw fragments that can only be identified as titanosuchian.

References

Tapinocephalians
Prehistoric therapsid genera
Permian synapsids of Africa